Buenos Aires, verano 1912 (English language: Buenos Aires, Summer 1912) is a 1966  Argentine black-and-white drama film comedy directed and written by Oscar Kantor with Pablo Palant. The film premiered on 1966 in Buenos Aires.

Cast
Augusto Bonardo
Ubaldo Martínez
Beto Gianola
Christina Banegas
Edmundo Rivero
Augusto Fernández
Marta Gam
Nelly Tesolín
Beatriz Matar
Alberto Fernández de Rosa
Agustín Alezzo
Víctor Proncet
Ignacio Finder
Jorge Amosa
Rodolfo Maertens
Ricardo Morán
Héctor Fuentes
María Armand
Chiry Rodríguez
Cacho Espíndola
Héctor Tealdi

External links
 

1966 films
1960s Spanish-language films
1966 comedy-drama films
Argentine black-and-white films
Films shot in Buenos Aires
Films set in Buenos Aires
Argentine comedy-drama films
1960s Argentine films